Electoral districts of Victoria are the electoral districts, commonly referred to as "seats" or "electorates", into which the Australian State of Victoria is divided for the purpose of electing members of the Victorian Legislative Assembly, one of the two houses of the Parliament of the State. The State is divided into 88 single-member districts. The Legislative Assembly has had 88 electorates since the 1985 election, increased from 81 previously.

Electoral boundaries are redrawn from time to time, in a process called redivision. The last redivision took place in 2021, when the Victorian Electoral Boundaries Commission reviewed Victoria's district boundaries. The boundaries arising from the 2013 redivision applied at the 2014 and the 2018 state elections. Previous redivisions took place in 2005, 2001 and 1991. A redivision is currently in progress and is expected to be completed by October 2021.

Current districts
As of November 2022, there are 88 electoral districts.

(Note: some current electoral districts have been previously abolished and recreated; the below table lists the year of each district’s original inception.)

2021 redistricting 
Due to the redistricting process that takes place every eight years, there were nine seats that were abolished and nine new seats.

Abolished 

 Altona
 Burwood
 Gembrook
 Buninyong
 Ferntree Gully
 Forest Hill
 Keysborough
 Mount Waverley
 Yuroke

New districts 

 Ashwood
 Berwick
 Eureka
 Glen Waverley
 Greenvale
 Kalkallo
 Laverton
 Pakenham
 Point Cook

Former districts

All districts with creation and abolition dates

References

Other sources
Hansard, Parliament of Victoria

 
Victoria
Victoria (Australia)-related lists